Bijan Barati (born August 10, 1997) is an Iranian volleyball player who plays as a Libero.

He played for Iran U19 and Iran U21.

Honours

National team

CISM Olympic Championship
5th (1): 2019
Islamic Olympic Championship
Gold medal (1): 2017
CISM Olympic Championship
Gold medal (1): 2016
Asian U19 Championship
Gold medal (1): 2014

Iran leagues
Iran youth super league: 3rd place with team Peykan tehran

References

1997 births
Living people
Iranian men's volleyball players
Liberos
Islamic Solidarity Games competitors for Iran